The Directorate of State Security, commonly called the Sigurimi, was the state security, intelligence and secret police service of the People's Socialist Republic of Albania. Its proclaimed goal was maintaining state security of Albania, but de facto the Sigurimi served to suppress political activity among the populace and preserve the existing political system.

In 2008 the Albanian parliament discussed opening the so-called "Sigurimi files", but the Socialist Party of Albania contested it.  A government commission, created in 2015, has been assigned the task of publicizing the Sigurimi files and identifying candidates for public office who had collaborated with the Communist regime; however, as of early 2017, the commission has not yet started its work, and critics have pointed out that most of the files were probably destroyed long ago.

History
The Sigurimi was established on 19 March 1943 according to Elsie, but according to recent studies it was instituted on the 10th of December 1944, named People's Defense Directory, direct translation of Serbo-Croat OZNA. Enver Hoxha typically credited the Sigurimi as having been instrumental in his faction's gaining power in Albania over other partisan groups. The People's Defense Division, formed in 1945 from Haxhi Lleshi's most reliable resistance fighters, was the precursor to the Sigurimi's 5,000-strong uniformed internal security force. 

In 1989 the division was organized into five regiments of mechanized infantry that could be ordered to quell any domestic disturbances posing a threat to the Party of Labour of Albania leadership. The Sigurimi had an estimated 30,000 officers, approximately 7,500 of them assigned to the People's Army.

The organization ceased to exist in name in July 1991 and was replaced by the SHIK (National Informative Service). In early 1992, information on the organization, responsibilities, and functions of the SHIK was not available in Western publications. Some Western observers believed, however, that many of the officers and leaders of the SHIK had served in the Sigurimi and that the basic structures of the two organizations were similar.

Activities
The mission of the Sigurimi was to prevent counterrevolutions and to suppress opposition to the existing political system. Although groups of Albanian émigrés sought Western support for their efforts to overthrow the Communist government in the late 1940s and early 1950s, they quickly ceased to be a credible threat because of the effectiveness of the Sigurimi.

The activities of the Sigurimi were directed more toward political and ideological opposition than crimes against persons or property, unless the latter were sufficiently serious and widespread to threaten the regime. Its activities permeated Albanian society to the extent that every third citizen had either served time in labor camps or been interrogated by Sigurimi officers. Sigurimi personnel were generally career volunteers, recommended by loyal party members and subjected to careful political and psychological screening before they were selected to join the service. They had an elite status and enjoyed many privileges designed to maintain their reliability and dedication to the party.

Organization

The Sigurimi had a national headquarters and district headquarters in each of Albania's twenty-six districts.

It was further organized into sections covering political control, censorship, public records, prison camps, internal security troops, physical security, counterespionage, and foreign intelligence.

The political control section's primary function was monitoring the ideological correctness of party members and other citizens. It was responsible for purging the party, government, military, and its own apparatus of individuals closely associated with Yugoslavia, the Soviet Union, or China after Albania broke from successive alliances with each of those countries. One estimate indicated that at least 170 communist party Politburo or Central Committee members were executed as a result of the Sigurimi's investigations. The political control section was also involved in an extensive program of monitoring private telephone conversations.

The censorship section operated within the press, radio, newspapers, and other communications media as well as within cultural societies, schools, and other organizations.

The public records section administered government documents and statistics, primarily social and economic statistics that were handled as state secrets.

The prison camps section was charged with the political reeducation of inmates and the evaluation of the degree to which they posed a danger to society. Local police supplied guards for fourteen prison camps throughout the country.

The physical security section provided guards for important party and government officials and installations.

The counterespionage section was responsible for neutralizing foreign intelligence operations in Albania as well as domestic movements and parties opposed to the Albanian Party of Labour.

Finally, the foreign intelligence section maintained personnel abroad and at home to obtain intelligence about foreign capabilities and intentions that affected Albania's national security. Its officers occupied cover positions in Albania's foreign diplomatic missions, trade offices, and cultural centers.

Directors

See also
AIDSSH
SHIK
SHISH
Museum of Secret Surveillance

References

External links
Library of Congress Country Study of AlbaniaData as of April 1992

Government agencies of Albania
Albanian intelligence agencies
 
Defunct intelligence agencies
Eastern Bloc
Law enforcement in communist states
People's Socialist Republic of Albania
Secret police